Ernst Stangl was an Austrian luger who competed in the early 1970s. A natural track luger, he won two gold medals in the men's singles (1970, 1973) and a bronze medal in the men's doubles (1975).

References
Natural track European Championships results 1970-2006.

Austrian male lugers
Living people
Year of birth missing (living people)